(), the feminine form of the German language adjective , is a word which described an important part of the Nazi ideology.

  — degenerate art;
  — degenerate music;
 an infamous exhibition of art the Nazis deemed “degenerate”; or
 Art looted by the Nazis during World War II.

It may also be used in reference to things that preceded the Nazi concept of “degenerate art”:

 the decadent movement, much of the art of which would be labeled  by the Nazis
 Degeneration by Max Nordau (1892)

References 

Nazi terminology
Nazi culture
German words and phrases
German art
Art controversies